Brome-Missisquoi is a regional county municipality in the Estrie region of Quebec, Canada. It lies in the Eastern Townships area.  The seat is Cowansville.
In 2021, it was transferred to the Estrie region from Montérégie.

In Parliament it is covered by the Brome—Missisquoi federal electoral district.

History 
In the 1980s, the RCM was formed from municipalities of historic Brome and Missisquoi counties. On January 1, 2010, the city of Bromont moved from La Haute-Yamaska Regional County Municipality to Brome-Missisquoi.

Subdivisions 
There are 21 subdivisions within the RCM:

Cities & Towns (7)
 Bedford
 Bromont
 Cowansville
 Dunham
 Farnham
 Lac-Brome
 Sutton

Municipalities (11)
 Bolton-Ouest
 Brigham
 East Farnham
 Frelighsburg
 Notre-Dame-de-Stanbridge
 Pike River
 Saint-Armand
 Saint-Ignace-de-Stanbridge
 Sainte-Sabine
 Stanbridge East
 Stanbridge Station

Townships (1)
 Bedford

Villages (2)
 Abercorn
 Brome

Demographics

Population

Language

Highways
Highways and numbered routes that run through the municipality, including external routes that start or finish at the county border:

 Autoroutes
 
  (planned)

 Principal Highways
 
 
 

 Secondary Highways
 
 
 
 
 
 
 
 

 External Routes

See also
 List of regional county municipalities and equivalent territories in Quebec

References

External links 
 Official site
 Official MRC site
 Tourism website of Brome-Missisquoi
 Cultural website of Brome-Missisquoi
 The Wine Route of Brome-Missisquoi
 Statistics Canada

 
Census divisions of Quebec